The 1909 AAA Championship Car season consisted of 24 races, beginning in Portland, Oregon on June 12 and concluding with a point-to-point race from Los Angeles, California to Phoenix, Arizona on November 6. There were three events sanctioned by the Automobile Club of America in Lowell, Massachusetts. The de facto National Champion as poled by the American automobile journal Motor Age was Bert Dingley. Points were not awarded by the AAA Contest Board during the 1909 season. Champions of the day were decided by C. G. "Chris" Sinsabaugh, an editor at Motor Age, based on merit and on track performance.

The points table was created retroactively in 1927 keeping Dingley as champion. In 1951 the championship standings were reworked, stripping the traditional champion of his title and giving it to George Robertson. All championship results should be considered unofficial.

Schedule and results

* Race halted at 235 miles due to track breaking up. AAA report states that race was halted at 245 miles.

** Event sanctioned by Automobile Club of America, 301–450, 231–300 & 161–230 run simultaneously.

*** All classes run simultaneously.

Leading National Championship standings

The points paying system for the 1909–1915 and 1917–1919 season were retroactively applied in 1927 and revised in 1951 using the points system from 1920. 

* Bert Dingley was poled as national champion in 1909 and held his championship when points were applied in 1927. These are the final standing as of 1951 after AAA revised the championship trail for 1909. The earliest known occurrence of George Robertson holding the title was in the 1952 Indianapolis 500 program.

See also
American Championship car racing

References

General references
http://www.champcarstats.com/year/1909.htm   accessed September 16, 2010
   accessed September 16, 2010
https://web.archive.org/web/20111226011449/http://www.motorsport.com/stats/champ/byyear.asp?Y=1909   accessed September 16, 2010

AAA Championship Car season
AAA Championship Car
AAA Championship Car season